Alexander Schädler (born 10 August 1977) is a retired Liechtenstein football midfielder.

References

1977 births
Living people
Liechtenstein footballers
USV Eschen/Mauren players
FC Balzers players
Association football midfielders
Liechtenstein international footballers